Kim Sun-hui (born 4 April 1972) is a North Korean footballer who played as a defender for the North Korea women's national football team. She was part of the team at the 1999 FIFA Women's World Cup. A tournament preview on the SoccerTimes.com website described her as: "the heart of the [team's] defense".

In February 1999 Kim played for a FIFA World XI in a 2–1 win over the United States, staged to coincide with the FIFA Women's World Cup draw.

North Korea qualified for their first FIFA Women's World Cup when they finished as 1997 AFC Women's Championship runners-up. They upset Japan 1–0 in the semi-final, in which Kim performed a marking job on Homare Sawa. She was praised by Japan's coach Satoshi Miyauchi: "Really skillful and a tremendous player. She's technically good, and she's a strong leader for the defense. She controls the other three defenders." After collecting her second yellow card of the tournament against Japan, she was suspended for North Korea's 2–0 final defeat by China.

At the 1998 Asian Games Kim captained North Korea to a silver medal following a golden goal defeat by China in the final.

References

1972 births
Living people
North Korean women's footballers
North Korea women's international footballers
Sportspeople from Pyongyang
1999 FIFA Women's World Cup players
Women's association football defenders
Footballers at the 1998 Asian Games
Asian Games silver medalists for North Korea
Asian Games medalists in football
Medalists at the 1998 Asian Games